Fox Crime is an Australian subscription television channel primarily screening crime drama television series. The channel launched on 7 November 2019, replacing TVHits.

History

TVHits (2014–2019)

In August 2013 it was announced Foxtel had failed to complete negotiations with the TV1 General Entertainment Partnership for a new carriage deal for their channel TV1, an Australian general entertainment channel dedicated to hit television series. As a result, Foxtel planned to replace it with another general entertainment channel once TV1's carriage deal had expired. In October 2013 it was announced TVHits, a channel owned and operated by Foxtel Networks, would replace TV1 on 1 January 2014. The branding logo used an exclamation point in place of the "I" character.

On 1 January 2014, the channel launched on pay television provider Foxtel (which included its streaming service Foxtel Go as well as its IPTV service Foxtel Play) as well as on Australian IPTV provider Fetch TV.

On 1 January 2019 TVHits ceased broadcasting on Fetch TV as the provider, and TVHits parent company Foxtel were unable to renew their supply agreement.

TVHits programming
At launch, TVHits' programming primarily consisted of hit American shows from Warner Bros., Carsey-Werner, Sony Pictures Television, CBS Studios International and NBCUniversal. However, following the rebrand of 111 on 1 November 2015, the channel's sitcoms moved to 111 and as a result, the channel became solely focused on dramas.

Fox Crime (2019–present)
In late 2019 Foxtel announced they would launch four new entertainment channels on 7 November 2019, one of which was Fox Crime. Fox Crime was described as offering crime and mystery series such as the CSI and NCIS franchises. This new channel would replace the existing TVHits which offered similar content. These new Fox-branded channels were a means of building and consolidating the Fox brand to combat increasing competition in the subscription television marketplace.

Programming
Bones 
Cold Case
Criminal Minds
CSI: Crime Scene Investigation
CSI: Miami
CSI: New York
NCIS
NCIS: Los Angeles 
NCIS: New Orleans
Without a Trace

Former programming

As TVHits
The 100
Blue BloodsDamagesEntertainment NowEverybody Loves RaymondFriendsHawaii Five-0How I Met Your MotherLaw & OrderThe MentalistMike & MollyThe NannySeinfeldThat '70s ShowTwo And A Half MenUnder the Dome''

See also
 Fox Crime
 Fox Crime (Asia)
 Fox Crime (Italy)

References

Television channels and stations established in 2019
Television networks in Australia
English-language television stations in Australia
2019 establishments in Australia
Foxtel
Crime television networks